Lubomir, Lyubomir, Lyubomyr, Lubomír, Ľubomír, or Ljubomir is a Slavic given name meaning lub (love) and mir (peace, world). Feminine forms are: Lubomira and Ljubica.

Nicknames 

Lubor, Luboš, Luborek, Lubošek, Borek, Lubo, Ľubo, Ljubo, Ljuba, Ljuban, Ljubiša, Ljupko, Ljupče.

Famous bearers 

 Ljubomir Fejsa - Serbian football player
 Ljubomir Nenadović - Serbian writer
 Ljubomir Stojanović - Serbian philologist
 Ljubomir Jovanović - Serbian politician and historian
 Ljubomir Kovačević - Serbian writer, historian, academic, and politician
 Ljubomir Davidović - Serbian politician, prime minister of the Kingdom of Serbs, Croats, and Slovenes.
 Ljubomir Tadić - Serbian philosopher
 Ljubomir Popović - Serbian painter
 Ljubomir Travica - Serbian volleyball coach and former player
 Ljubomir Davidović - Serbian/Yugoslav politician
 Ljubomir "Ljupko" Petrović - former Yugoslav football player and current coach
 Ljubomir Ljubojević - Yugoslav/Serbian Grandmaster of chess
 Ljubomir Babić - birth name of Croatian writer Ksaver Šandor Gjalski
 Ljubomir Kerekeš - Croatian actor
 Ljubomir Frčkoski - Macedonian politician
 Ljubomir Radanović - former Yugoslav/Montenegrin football player
 Ljubomir Vračarević - Serbian martial artist
 Ljubomir Vranješ - Swedish handball player
 Ľubomír Feldek - Slovak writer
 Ľubomír Moravčík - Slovak footballer
 Ľubomír Vaškovič - Slovak ice hockey player
 Ľubomír Višňovský - Slovak ice hockey player
 Lubomír Brabec - Czech guitarist
 Lubomír Kostelka - Czech actor
 Lubomír Lipský - Czech actor
 Lubomír Martínek - Czech author
 Lubomír Malý - Czech violist
 Lubomír Mátl - Czech conductor
 Ľubomir Mišak - Slovak Stuntman and Stunt Coordinator
 Lubomír Štrougal - Czechoslovak prime minister
 Lubomír Zaorálek - Czech politician
 Lyubomir Ivanov (explorer) - Bulgarian scientist, non-governmental activist, and Antarctic explorer
 Lyubomir Miletich - Bulgarian linguist, ethnographer, dialectologist and historian
 Lyubomir Neikov - Bulgarian comedian
 Lubomir Geraskov - Bulgarian gymnast and Olympic champion
 Lubomyr Husar -  major archbishop emeritus of the Ukrainian Catholic Church
 Lyubomyr Polatayko - Ukrainian professional racing cyclist
 Lyubomyr Halchuk - Professional Ukrainian football defender who plays for FC Lviv
 Lubomír Jančařík - Professional Czech table tennis player

See also
 Ljuba (name)
 Ljubo
 Luboš

Articles 
Seznam článků začínajících na „Lubomír“

External links 
 http://www.behindthename.com/name/lubomi10r

Slavic masculine given names
Serbian masculine given names
Belarusian masculine given names
Bosnian masculine given names
Bulgarian masculine given names
Croatian masculine given names
Czech masculine given names
Macedonian masculine given names
Montenegrin masculine given names
Slovak masculine given names
Slovene masculine given names
Polish masculine given names

Ukrainian masculine given names
Masculine given names